Deborah Ellen Huband (born 5 September 1956) is a Canadian basketball player. She competed in the women's tournament at the 1984 Summer Olympics.

Playing career
As a basketball player at Bishop's University, she set a U Sports single-game scoring record (since broken) with 50 points in a game during the 1981-82 season. 

With the Bishop's Gaiters women's basketball' program, she was part of three consecutive QUAA titles (1977-80), complemented by selections to the CIAU All-Canadian team twice, along with recognition as the Bishop's Female Athlete of the Year three times.

Canadian national team
As a member of the Canadian national basketball team, she served as team captain from 1979 to 1986. Debbie Huband was a member of the bronze medal winning teams at the 1979 and 1987 Pan American Games.

Coaching career
As the UBC Thunderbirds women's basketball head coach, Huband captured three national titles (2003-04, '05-06, '07-08), winning the Bronze Baby, and four conference championships (2006-07, '07-08, '11-12, '14-15). On 11 January 2020, Huband captured her 338th regular season coaching win in Canada West Universities Athletic Association play, as the Thunderbirds prevailed over the Trinity Western Spartans by a 100-57 mark. With the win, she eclipsed former University of Victoria head coach Kathy Shields for the all-time wins record in Canada West women's basketball.

Awards and honors
1978 CIS Championship MVP: Deb Huband
1994 inductee - Canadian Basketball Hall of Fame
1995 inductee - Ottawa Sports Hall of Fame
1995 Inductee - Bishop's University Wall of Distinction
 2003-04 Canada West Coach of the Year 
 2003-04 Peter Ennis Award awarded to the U Sports Coach of the Year 
2017 inductee - Basketball BC Hall of Fame
2018 Sport BC In Her Footsteps Honouree
Top 100 U Sports women's basketball Players of the Century (1920-2020).

References

External links
 

1956 births
Living people
Canadian women's basketball players
Olympic basketball players of Canada
Basketball players at the 1984 Summer Olympics
Basketball players from Ottawa
Bishop's Gaiters women's basketball players
UBC Thunderbirds
Universiade bronze medalists for Canada
Universiade medalists in basketball
Medalists at the 1979 Summer Universiade